USS Garland is a name used more than once by the U.S. Navy:

 , was a bark built at Quincy, Massachusetts, in 1815 for service as a privateer
 , was a minesweeper launched 20 February 1944

United States Navy ship names